Relly is a personal name. Notable people include:

 Gavin Relly (1926–1999), South African businessman, chairman of Anglo American
 Gina Relly (1891–1985), French film actress of the silent era
 James Relly (1722–1778), Welsh Methodist minister, inspired Universalism in the United States
 John Relly Beard (1800–1876), English Unitarian minister, schoolmaster, university lecturer, and translator
 Relly Raffman (1921–1988), composer and professor of music at Clark University, Massachusetts, US
Rellys (1905–1991), French actor

See also 
 Rally (disambiguation)
 Relli (disambiguation)
 Rely (disambiguation)